TP53-regulating kinase, also known as PRPK is an enzyme that in humans is encoded by the TP53RK gene. This protein is a serine/threonine protein kinase that phosphorylates p53 at Ser15.

PRPK is part of the KEOPS/EKC complex, which participates in transcription control, telomere regulation  and tRNA modification.

Model organisms 

Model organisms have been used in the study of TP53RK function. A conditional knockout mouse line called Trp53rktm1a(EUCOMM)Wtsi was generated at the Wellcome Trust Sanger Institute. Male and female animals underwent a standardized phenotypic screen to determine the effects of deletion. Additional screens performed:  - In-depth immunological phenotyping

References

Further reading